Massey is a northern suburb in West Auckland, New Zealand. It was formerly a northern suburb of Waitakere City, which existed from 1989 to 2010 before the city was amalgamated into Auckland Council. The suburb was named after former Prime Minister of New Zealand William Massey. Massey is a relatively large suburb and can be divided into three reasonably distinctive areas, Massey West, Massey East (separated by the north-western motorway) and Massey North (situated to the north of Royal Road). Parts of Massey East are also known as 'Royal Heights', which is home to the Royal Heights shopping centre.

The suburb features the Massey YMCA Leisure Centre, Library. The Westgate Shopping Centre on Hobsonville Road next to the north-western motorway and NorthWest Shopping Centre (which opened in October, 2015) to the north of Hobsonville Road are north of Massey.

History

The area is within the traditional rohe of Te Kawerau ā Maki, and is the location of Pukewhakataratara, a mountain known as Redhill to European settlers. The literal translation of the name is "hill that poses a challenge or obstacle", and is one of Ngā Rau Pou a Maki, the hills in the upper Waitākere Ranges area that reference Maki, the eponymous ancestor of Te Kawerau ā Maki. In pre-European times, the bush-covered hill was a natural obstacle for people attempting to access the Waitākere Ranges from the Waitematā Harbour. The area was a part of the walking routes connecting the settlements of the upper Waitematā Harbour, Waitākere River Valley to other areas of West Auckland and the Tāmaki isthmus.

The area was purchased by the Crown for European settlers in August 1853, as a part of the Mangatoetoe Block. The first known settlers on record were the Nicolas family, who were awarded a government land grant in 1882. The area was originally named Lawsonville, and was the site of the Birdwood Estate. From the 1890s until the early 1910s, the south-west Massey area was known for the camp of Don Buck, a Portuguese immigrant to New Zealand who employed ex-convicts in the gum digging trade. The area was renamed Massey circa 1915, in honour of Prime Minister William Massey.

The area experienced growth in the 1960s, after the Poultrymen's Association opened a branch in Massey in June 1960.

Demographics

Massey had a population of 17,676 at the 2018 New Zealand census, an increase of 1,671 people (10.4%) since the 2013 census, and an increase of 3,243 people (22.5%) since the 2006 census. There were 4,980 households, comprising 8,907 males and 8,769 females, giving a sex ratio of 1.02 males per female, with 4,152 people (23.5%) aged under 15 years, 4,308 (24.4%) aged 15 to 29, 7,767 (43.9%) aged 30 to 64, and 1,452 (8.2%) aged 65 or older.

Ethnicities were 47.6% European/Pākehā, 19.5% Māori, 23.8% Pacific peoples, 25.1% Asian, and 3.6% other ethnicities. People may identify with more than one ethnicity.

The percentage of people born overseas was 36.5, compared with 27.1% nationally.

Although some people chose not to answer the census's question about religious affiliation, 40.8% had no religion, 40.9% were Christian, 1.3% had Māori religious beliefs, 5.4% were Hindu, 3.0% were Muslim, 1.4% were Buddhist and 1.9% had other religions.

Of those at least 15 years old, 2,556 (18.9%) people had a bachelor's or higher degree, and 2,307 (17.1%) people had no formal qualifications. 1,803 people (13.3%) earned over $70,000 compared to 17.2% nationally. The employment status of those at least 15 was that 7,347 (54.3%) people were employed full-time, 1,614 (11.9%) were part-time, and 687 (5.1%) were unemployed.

Education
Massey is home to one secondary school, Massey High School, where the principal is former Tall Blacks captain Glen Denham as well as several primary schools, including Lincoln Heights School, Royal Road Primary School, Massey Primary School and Don Buck Primary School. Massey Primary School was the first school in the district, opening in 1925. Massey is not home to Massey University, which is based in Palmerston North with its Auckland campus at Albany.

Governance
In New Zealand's national Parliament, Massey is represented by Member for Upper Harbour, National MP Paula Bennett who won the electorate in 2014 and 2017. As of the 2017 election no other MP who contested the Upper Harbour electorate has been represented in parliament as a list MP. Prior to changes in electorate boundaries, Massey fell within the Te Atatū electorate and was represented in 2011 by Member for Te Atatū, Labour MP Phil Twyford.

In terms of regional governance, Massey falls within the Waitākere ward and subsequently under the Henderson-Massey Local Board area  of the Auckland City council. The Henderson-Massey local board area covers the suburbs of West Harbour, Massey, Ranui, Te Atatū Peninsula, Te Atatū South, Lincoln, Henderson, Western Heights, Glendene, and Sunnyvale and contained a population of 107,685 in the 2013 census. Previously Massey fell under the Massey Ward which contained the suburbs of Whenuapai, Hobsonville, Herald Island, West Harbour, Massey, Ranui, and Henderson North.

Sport
The local rugby club is a member of the North Harbour Rugby Union and won the championship 6 times (1993, 2004, 2005, 2013, 2015 and 2016). Former All Black Jonah Lomu signed to play for Massey in 2005, but due to an injury was unable to play for them that season. He did however eventually make his debut for the club in 2006.

Notable people
Massey is home to rugby players George Pisi and Tusi Pisi (North Harbour, Samoa and New Zealand 7's) as well as the musicians Blindspott.

List of parks in the Massey suburb

Claverdon Park
Cyclarama Reserve
Kemp Park
Helena Park
Keegan Park
Lendich Reserve
Lincoln Park
Lowtherhurst Reserve
Makora Park
Massey Domain
Moire Park
Raelene Reserve
Reynella Park
Royal Reserve
Sarajevo Reserve
Spargo Reserve
Sunline Park
Taitapu Park
Tatyana Park
Triangle Park
Zita Maria Park

References

External links
Photographs of Massey held in Auckland Libraries' heritage collections.
Massey's changing landscape Historypin collection.

Suburbs of Auckland
Henderson-Massey Local Board Area
Populated places around the Waitematā Harbour
West Auckland, New Zealand